Robert Moffat (21 December 1795 – 9 August 1883) was a Scottish Congregationalist missionary to Africa, father of Mary Moffat Livingstone and father-in-law of David Livingstone, and first translator of the Bible into Setswana.

Life
Moffat was born of humble parentage in Ormiston, East Lothian. To find employment, he moved south to Cheshire in England as a gardener. In 1814, whilst employed at West Hall, High Legh in Cheshire he experienced difficulties with his employer due to his Methodist sympathies. For a short period, after having applied successfully to the London Missionary Society (LMS) to become an overseas missionary, he took an interim post as a farmer, at Plantation Farm in Dukinfield (where he first met Mary his future wife). The job had been found for him by William Roby, who took Moffat under his wing for a year.

In September 1816, Moffat was formally commissioned at Surrey Chapel in London as a missionary of LMS (on the same day as John Williams) and was sent out to South Africa. His fiancée Mary Smith (1795–1870) was able to join him three years later, after he returned to Cape Town from Namaqualand.

In 1820 Moffat and his wife left the Cape and proceeded to Griquatown, where their daughter Mary (who was later to marry David Livingstone) was born. The family later settled at Kuruman, to the north of the Vaal River, among the Batswana people. Here they lived and worked passionately for the missionary cause, enduring many hardships.  Once he went for days without water and his mouth became so dry he was unable to speak.  Often he bound his stomach to help him endure fasting when he could not find food to eat. During this period, Robert Moffat made frequent journeys into the neighbouring regions as far north as the Matabele country.  He communicated the results of these journeys to the Royal Geographical Society (Journal 25-38 and Proceedings ii). Whilst in Britain on leave (1839–43) an account of the family's experience, Missionary Labours and Scenes in South Africa (1842) was published. He translated the whole of the Bible and The Pilgrim's Progress into Bechuanas, although these translations are today considered as poor and relying on many colonial and racist assumptions about the Setswana language. Besides his early training as a gardener and farmer, and later as a writer, Moffat developed skills in building, carpentry, printing and as a blacksmith.

Robert and Mary Moffat had ten children: Mary (who married David Livingstone), Ann, Robert (who died as an infant), Robert (who died at the age of 87, leaving an uncompleted, but published, work on the Setswana language), Helen, Elizabeth (who also died as an infant), James, John, Elizabeth and Jean. Their son John Smith Moffat became an LMS missionary and took over the running of the mission at Kuruman before entering colonial service. Their grandson Howard Unwin Moffat became a prime minister of Southern Rhodesia.  Mary preceded Robert in death in 1870, at home in England where they had returned because of failing health.  The couple also adopted children.  John Mokoteri and Sarah Roby were the adopted children of Robert Moffat and his wife, Mary. Although adopted, they ended up holding positions of servitude for the Moffats. For the last twelve years of his life, Robert spoke throughout England, seeking to raise interest in the mission work.  He was presented to Queen Victoria twice at her request and was presented with a Doctor of Divinity degree from Edinburgh University.

Robert Moffat died at Leigh, near Tunbridge Wells, on 9 August 1883, and is buried at West Norwood Cemetery. A memorial monument, paid for by public subscription, was erected at his birthplace in 1885.

Legacy
 Residents of High Legh organise a Robert Moffat Memorial 10 km run beginning and ending at his cottage.
 His printing work in Kuruman was supported by an iron hand press that was brought to Natal in 1825 and taken to Kuruman in 1831. Rev. Moffat used it until 1870 when he retired, after which it was taken over by William Aston and A J Gould and was in use until about 1882. In 1918 it was taken to the Kimberley Public Library where it remained until it was returned to the Moffat Mission in Kuruman in 1996. It is back in occasional use printing commemorative documents.

Works
 
 
 
  (Tswana hymn book)

Notes and references

Further reading
 William Walters (1885) Life and Labours of Robert Moffat, D.D., Missionary in South Africa, 
 John Smith Moffat (1885) Lives of Robert and Mary Moffat
 C. S. Home (1894) The Story of the L. M. S. 
 Alan Butler (1987) Kuruman Moffat Mission, Kuruman Moffat Mission Trust, Kuruman

External links
 Friends of West Norwood Cemetery (Word format)
 Robert Moffat biographies
 Moffat Mission near Kuruman, Northern Cape, South Africa

·

1795 births
1883 deaths
People from East Lothian
Congregationalist missionaries in South Africa
Scottish Congregationalist missionaries
Scottish evangelicals
Bible translators
Burials at West Norwood Cemetery
Scottish Congregationalist ministers
19th-century Congregationalist ministers
South African printers
South African explorers
19th-century translators
Missionary linguists